Carl Heinrich Graun (7 May 1704 – 8 August 1759) was a German composer and tenor. Along with Johann Adolph Hasse, he is considered to be the most important German composer of Italian opera of his time.

Biography
Graun was born in Wahrenbrück in the Electorate of Saxony. In 1714, he followed his brother, Johann Gottlieb Graun, to the school of the Kreuzkirche, Dresden, and sang in the Dresdner Kreuzchor and the chorus of the Opernhaus am Zwinger. In 1724, Graun moved to Braunschweig, singing at the opera house and writing six operas for the company. In 1735, Graun moved to Rheinsberg in Brandenburg, after he had written the opera Lo specchio della fedeltà for the marriage of the then crown prince Frederick (the Great) and Elisabeth Christine in Schloss Salzdahlum in 1733. He was Kapellmeister to Frederick the Great from his ascension to the throne in 1740 until Graun's death nineteen years later in Berlin.

Graun wrote a number of operas. His opera Cesare e Cleopatra inaugurated the opening of the Berlin State Opera (Königliche Hofoper) in 1742. Montezuma (1755) was written to a libretto by King Frederick. His works are rarely played today, though his passion cantata Der Tod Jesu (The Death of Jesus, 1755) was frequently performed in Germany for many years after his death. His other works include concertos and trio sonatas. He was known for particularly good text-setting, probably due to his background as a vocalist.

He married twice and had a daughter, who became a singer, from his first marriage and four sons from his second. His great-great-great-great-grandson, Vladimir Nabokov, became an eminent 20th-century novelist.

Works

Stage works 
Polydorus (5 acts, 1726–28)
Iphigenia in Aulis (3 acts 1728)
Scipio Africanus (3 acts, 1732)
Lo specchio della fedeltà (3 acts, 1733)
Pharao Tubaetes (5 acts, 1735)
Rodelinda, regina de' langobardi (3 acts, 1741)
Cesare e Cleopatra (3 acts, 1742)
Artaserse, libretto by Metastasio (3 acts, 1743)
Catone in Utica, libretto by Metastasio (3 acts, 1743)
Alessandro e Poro, libretto by Metastasio (3 acts, 1744)
Lucio Papirio (3 acts, 1744)
Adriano in Siria, libretto by Metastasio (3 acts, 1746)
Demofoonte, libretto by Metastasio (3 acts, 1746)
Cajo Fabricio (3 acts, 1746)
Le feste galanti (1747)
Cinna (3 acts, 1748)
L'Europa galante (1748)
Ifigenia in Aulide (3 acts, 1748)
Angelica e Medoro (3 acts, 1749)
Coriolano (3 acts, 1749)
Fetonte (3 acts, 1750)
Il Mithridate (3 acts, 1751)
L’Armida (3 acts, 1751)
Britannico (3 acts, 1751)
L'Orfeo (3 acts, 1752)
Il giudizio di Paride (1 act, 1752)
Silla (3 acts, 1753)
Semiramide (3 acts, 1754)
Montezuma (3 acts, 1755)
Ezio, libretto by Metastasio (1755)
I fratelli nemici (3 acts, 1756)
La Merope (3 acts, 1756)

Other works
Te Deum
Ein Lämmlein geht und trägt die Schuld Passion cantata (ca. 1730)
Kommt her und schaut (Große Passion) (1730)
Der Tod Jesu, Passion cantata (1755)
Oratorium in Festum Nativitatis Christi, Christmas oratorio
Easter Oratorium
Six Italian Cantatas
Concerto for Horn, Strings and Cembalo D major
Lieder (1743)
Sinfonia C major
Concerto for Viola da gamba
Harpsichord Concerto in C minor
Gigue in B-flat minor

Bibliography
John W. Grubbs (1972): The Sacred Choral Music of the Graun Brothers, 1972

Notes

Sources
"Graun, Carl Heinrich" by E. Eugene Helm, in The New Grove Dictionary of Opera, ed. Stanley Sadie (London, 1992)

External links

 
 
 

1704 births
1759 deaths
People from Uebigau-Wahrenbrück
People from the Electorate of Saxony
German Baroque composers
German opera composers
German Classical-period composers
German male classical composers
18th-century classical composers
18th-century German composers
18th-century German male musicians
People educated at the Kreuzschule
General directors of the Berlin State Opera